Lithodesmium is a genus of diatoms belonging to the family Lithodesmiaceae.

The genus has cosmopolitan distribution.

Species

Species:

Lithodesmium africanum 
Lithodesmium asketogonium 
Lithodesmium biceps 
 Lithodesmium californicum Grunow, 1883
 Lithodesmium contractum L.W.Bailey, 1861
 Lithodesmium cornigerum J.Brun, 1896
 Lithodesmium duckerae Von Stosch, 1987
 Lithodesmium ehrenbergii Forti
 Lithodesmium hirtum (Ehrenberg)
 Lithodesmium margaritaceum Long, Fuge & Smith, 1946
 Lithodesmium minusculum
 Lithodesmium pliocenicum Schrader, 1973
 Lithodesmium reynoldsii Barron, 1976
 Lithodesmium rotunda Schrader, 1976
 Lithodesmium undulatum Ehrenberg, 1839
 Lithodesmium variabile Takano, 1979
 Lithodesmium victoriae Karsten, 1906

References

Diatoms
Diatom genera